
Year 671 (DCLXXI) was a common year starting on Wednesday (link will display the full calendar) of the Julian calendar. The denomination 671 for this year has been used since the early medieval period, when the Anno Domini calendar era became the prevalent method in Europe for naming years.

Events 
 December 7 – An annular solar eclipse is visible from Tibet to the Maghreb.

 By place 
 Europe 
 Perctarit returns to Lombardy from exile and reclaims his realm, which is being ruled on behalf of Garibald, since his father King Grimoald I died. He deposes the young king, and becomes the new ruler of the Lombard Kingdom in Italy. During his reign Perctarit makes Catholicism the official religion, but does not recognize papal authority. Grimoald is buried in the St. Ambrogio Church (Milan).

 Britain 
 Battle of Two Rivers: King Ecgfrith of Northumbria defeats the Picts under King Drest VI, in the vicinity of Moncreiffe Island, near Perth (Scotland). After the battle the Picts are reduced to slavery, and subject to the yoke of captivity for the next 14 years.

 Asia 
 Yijing, Chinese Buddhist monk, travels by boat from Guangzhou, and visits the capital of the partly Buddhist kingdom of Srivijaya in Palembang (Indonesia). He stays for 6 months to study Sanskrit grammar and the Malay language.
 June 10 – Emperor Tenji introduces a water clock (clepsydra) called Rokoku. The instrument, which measures time and indicates hours, is placed in the capital of Ōtsu in Japan.
 Silla seizes control of the former Baekje capital of Sabi from the Tang Protectorate General to Pacify the East.

Births 
 Sigebert IV, Frankish prince (approximate date)

Deaths 
 Grimoald I, king of the Lombards

References